Macina (also Ké Macina and Massina) is a small town and rural commune in the Cercle of Macina in the Ségou Region of southern-central Mali. The commune covers an area of 1,100 square kilometers and contains the main town and 20 villages. In the 2009 census the commune had a population of 36,170.

The town of Macina lies on the north (left) bank of the Niger River. The farmland around the town forms part of the irrigated area of the Office du Niger and is used for growing rice. Water is diverted from the Niger River upstream of the Markala dam and fed into a system of canals.

References

External links
.

Communes of Ségou Region
Communities on the Niger River